Wayne State was to begin its 13th season of women’s ice hockey on September 30, 2011. In its twelve existing seasons, the Warriors compiled a won-loss record of 138-209-29 (.406 winning percentage). In College Hockey America conference play, the program accumulated an all-time CHA mark of 48-59-7 (.452) in nine seasons. In 2007-08, Wayne State tied for the CHA regular-season title in 2007-08. Senior forward Alyssa Baldin was to serve as captain for the second consecutive year. Of note, Baldin was the Warriors active scoring leader (while ranking seventh all-time in career points). Wayne State was the only Division I women’s program in Michigan.

Offseason
May 11: Wayne State University head women’s hockey coach Jim Fetter announced the team captains for the upcoming season. Senior forward Alyssa Baldin was to serve as captain for the second consecutive year. Of note, Baldin was the Warriors active scoring leader (while ranking seventh all-time in career points). Senior Ciara Lee, senior forward Veronique Laramee-Paquette and junior forward Gina Buquet were named assistant captains.
May 27: Wayne State University discontinued its women’s ice hockey program. School officials declared the decision was necessary as a result of continuing reductions in the state of Michigan appropriations towards higher education.

Transfers

Regular season

Standings

Schedule
Had the Warriors iced a team for the season, their designated schedule would have had them open the season versus WCHA team Ohio State. Their first conference game would have been versus the Mercyhurst Lakers on November 4

References

Wayne State
Wayne State Warriors women's ice hockey seasons